Hempel is a name of German, Dutch and Swedish origin and the surname of a Swedish noble family.

The following people have the surname:

Adolph Hempel (1870–1949), Brazilian entomologist
Amy Hempel (born 1951), American writer and professor
Anouska Hempel (born 1941), New Zealand-born hotelier and designer and former actress
Bill Hempel (1920–2001), American football player
Carl Gustav Hempel (1905–1997), German-American philosopher
Charles Frederick Hempel (1811–1867), German organist and composer, son of Charles William Hempel
Charles Julius Hempel (1811–1879), German-born translator and homeopathic physician
Charles William Hempel (1777–1855), English organist
Eduard Hempel (1887–1972), Nazi German Minister to Ireland (1937–1945)
Fábio Hempel (born 1980), Brazilian athlete
Frieda Hempel (1885–1955), German-American soprano
Gotthilf Hempel (born 1929), German marine biologist and oceanographer
Hazel Hempel Abel (1888–1966), United States Republican Party Senator for Nebraska (1954)
Jan Hempel (born 1971), German Olympic diver
Johan Wilhelm Hempel (1860–1920), Danish sea captain
John Hempel (born 1935), American mathematician
Jutta Hempel (born 1960), German chess prodigy
Lothar Hempel (born 1966), German artist
Marc Hempel (born 1957), contemporary American cartoonist
Peter Hempel (born 1959), East German Olympic canoer
Udo Hempel (born 1946), German Olympic road and track cyclist

See also
Hempel Group, Danish coatings supplier company
Hempel's paradox (or Hempel's ravens), synonyms for the Raven paradox named after Carl Gustav Hempel
Hempel's dilemma, named after Carl Gustav Hempel
Hempel Hotel, hotel in London
9820 Hempel, asteroid

See also
Hampel
Hampl
Hample